The Liberation of Strasbourg took place on 23 November 1944 during the Alsace campaign (November 1944 – March 1945) in the last months of World War 2.

Battle
On November 22, 1944, the hard-fighting French 2nd Armored Division, along with the French First Army, had been assigned the capture of Strasbourg by Allied Supreme Command.  That same day, the 2nd Armored moved up to the vital pass at Saverne, which had been taken by the Americans, about 40 km northwest of Strasbourg.  This Saverne "gap" is the historic gateway through the barrier of the Vosges Mountains, opening a line of advance on Strasbourg.

On November 23, 1944, units of the French 2nd Armored Division entered the city and raised the Free French tricolor over Strasbourg cathedral at 2:30 pm.

The German collective memory of the battle is rather more bleak. In Ardennes: 1944, Antony Beevor states that the Battle for Strasbourg was one of the more "inglorious episodes" in German military history with a collapse of the Wehrmacht defence that was both premature and ignominious. It was hastened by a panic of senior Nazi leadership as many officials fled prior to the Allied push.  This led to a general demoralization of Heer, Waffen-SS, and Luftwaffe ground forces as well as a breakdown in discipline. He states: ″The SS had looted Strasbourg before withdrawing. According to one general defending the town, soldiers ordered to 'fight to the last round' tended to throw away most of their ammunition before the battle, so they could claim that they ran out and then surrender. Generalmajor Vaterrodt, the (Heer) commander, was scornful about the behavior of senior officers and Nazi Party officials. 'I'm surprised that Himmler did not have anyone hanged in Strasbourg,' he told fellow officers after he had been captured. 'Everyone ran away, Kreisleiter, Ortsgruppenleiter, the municipal authorities, the mayor and the deputy mayor, they all took to their heels, government officials--all fled.'" The Alsatian-born Chief Magistrate also fled towards Germany on foot with a backpack--as he had signed many death warrants and collaborated within the German occupation system and was a marked man.

Aftermath
The rapid Liberation of Strasbourg by General Leclerc's 2nd Armored Division produced a torrent of joy in the newly liberated French nation and was a hugely symbolic victory for the French people and the Western Allies in general. Leclerc was well respected and liked by his American contemporaries, unlike some other French commanders. The Liberation and Tricolor raised over the cathedral was considered to be the last major objective in the Liberation of France.

Unfortunately the Allies were unable to quickly seize on the German collapse. While fuel shortages and the increasing difficulty of supporting armies with lengthening supply lines played a role, General Dwight D. Eisenhower's lack of interest in his southern flank largely doomed any further exploitation around Strasbourg. The commander of the American 6th Army Group, General Jacob L. Devers, believed he could cross the Rhine quickly at Rastatt thereby seizing a bridgehead. However, Devers' ambitious nature and aggressive personality somewhat alienated other commanders such as Eisenhower, and he failed to convince The Supreme Commander of his plan.

A potential bridgehead at Rastatt, had it been quickly seized, would more than likely have secured the southern flank and would have severely disrupted the coming German offensive in the Ardennes.  But Eisenhower never seriously considered the opportunity as he seemed fixated on a more direct route to Berlin. As a result, Strasbourg would become threatened during the German Wacht am Rhein offensive known as The Battle of the Bulge in the West.

The German counterattack
In early January 1945, the German counteroffensive into France known as Operation Nordwind was quickly contained, but not before both Eisenhower and Devers considered a general withdrawal from Alsace, which would have left Strasbourg undefended. The French Provisional Government considered this an anathema as it was, in General de Gaulle's words, "a national disaster." The German radio announced that in a few days the Swastika "will fly over the Strasbourg Cathedral." In addition to this, hundreds-of-thousands of Alsatians would be subjected to German reprisals. As a Strabourgoise woman, identified as Madame Siegfried, said in an interview:To have enjoyed six weeks of liberty after three years of permanent tension, permanent fear, and to believe once again that they [the Germans] would come back; it was beyond my forces. It was such a panic, a true fear as I have never known since then. Neither the bombings nor anything else but to hear they might come back!The talk of a strategic withdrawal was also a blow to morale of the American VI Corps that had fought hard and suffered many casualties securing the area.  In response General Charles de Gaulle threatened to pull his forces out of the overall SHAEF Command creating a serious row with Eisenhower.  With the support of British Prime Minister Winston Churchill, de Gaulle won over Ike after a contentious argument.  Strasbourg was not to be abandoned as the order to withdraw to the east of the Vosges Mountains was rescinded - boosting VI Corps' morale.

General Jean de Lattre announced to the civilian population that Strasbourg, "liberated by Frenchmen, would be defended by Frenchmen." French units in the 1st Army would fight doggedly below the weight of five German divisions and would not relent - even to the point of units being virtually wiped out, such as the Tahiti Battalion (Bataillon du Pacifique), a veteran of The Battle Of Bir Hakeim.

The French held their ground and the German advance was halted in desperate fighting about 40 kilometers west of Strasbourg and Operation Nordwind became another disaster for the German Heer and Waffen-SS with important divisions reduced.

Impact
  

The Liberation of Strasbourg has been memorialized throughout Alsace as a major victory for the French armed forces and for the Allies' advance across France toward Germany in 1944. Memorials include: the Museum of the Surrender, the Memorial-Museum of the Colmar Pocket, and MM Park.

Alsace, of which Strasbourg is the capital, had been the focus of French-German enmity since the Franco-Prussian War of 1870–71, and General Charles de Gaulle insisted that only French forces should retake it. After the victory of Kufra, General Philippe Leclerc de Hauteclocque and his troops swore an oath to fight until "our flag flies over the Cathedral of Strasbourg."

The oath was fulfilled on 23 November 1944, when the 2nd French Armoured Division under Leclerc's command liberated Strasbourg.

References

Battles involving France
Battles in Grand Est
Conflicts in 1944
1944 in France
Military operations of World War II involving Germany
Liberation